Roger Antoine Duvoisin (August 28, 1900 – June 30, 1980) was a Swiss-born American writer and illustrator, best known for children's picture books. He won the 1948 Caldecott Medal for picture books and in 1968 he was a highly commended runner-up for the biennial, international Hans Christian Andersen Award for children's illustrators.

Life

Duvoisin was born in Geneva, Switzerland, in 1900. He learned to draw early having been encouraged by his father, who was an architect, and his godmother, a well-known painter of enamels. He studied at the École Nationale Supérieure des Arts Décoratifs in Paris. His first job was designing scenery, making posters, and painting murals. He also became a manager of an old French pottery plant before becoming involved with textile design, an occupation that eventually brought him to the United States. He married Louise Fatio, another artist from Switzerland. In 1927, they moved to New York City where he worked on children's books and magazine illustrations. He became an American citizen in 1938.

Duvoisin died in June 1980. He sometimes gave 1904 as his year of birth but he was nearly 80 at his death, born in 1900—the US Library of Congress learned from a publisher, indirectly from his widow. Jeanne Blackmore, Duvoisin's granddaughter, is also an author with her first children's book, How Does Sleep Come? published in 2012.

Books and awards

Duvoisin wrote his first book in the U.S.

He won the Caldecott Medal for White Snow, Bright Snow, written by Alvin Tresselt (D. Lothrop Co., 1947). The annual American Library Association award recognizes the illustrator of the year's "most distinguished American picture book for children". Their 1965 collaboration Hide and Seek Fog was one of three Caldecott runners-up.

Fatio wrote and Duvoisin illustrated The Happy Lion, a picture book published by McGraw-Hill in 1954. It was her first book and the first of ten Happy Lion books they created together (1954–1980). Its German-language edition (Der glückliche Löwe) won the inaugural 1956 Deutscher Jugendliteraturpreis.

Duvoisin both wrote and illustrated a successful series featuring Petunia the goose and Veronica the hippopotamus, inaugurated by Petunia (Alfred A. Knopf, 1950) and Veronica (Knopf, 1961; The Bodley Head, 1961). Duvoisin's works also include translation and illustration of medieval European folk tales such as The Crocodile in the Tree (1973).

In 1961, he received an award from the Society of Illustrators. In 1966, he received the Rugers Bi-Centennial award.

His books were published by The Bodley Head Ltd in London, Sydney and Toronto.

Books 
Donkey–Donkey (1934)
Mother Goose: A Comprehensive Collection of Rhymes (1936)
And There Was America (1938)
Fairy Tales from Switzerland. The Three Sneezes and Other Swiss Tales (1941)
They Put Out To Sea (1944)
The Talking Cat and Other Tales of French Canada by Natalie Savage Carlson illustrated by Roger Duvoisin (1952)
Crocus (1977) 
Day and Night (1960) 
The Crocodile In The Tree (1972)
Easter Treat (1954)
Happy Lion (1954)
The Happy Hunter (1961)
Hide and Seek Fog (1965)
The House of Four Seasons (1956)
Jasmine (1973)
Our Veronica Goes to Petunia's Farm (1962)
Petunia (1950)
Petunia and the Song (1951)
Petunia's Christmas (1952)
Petunia Takes A Trip (1953)
Petunia, Beware! (1958)
Petunia, I love You (1965)
Petunia's Treasure (1975)
Snowy and Woody (1979) 
Spring Snow (1963)
The Miller, His Son, and Their Donkey, a retelling of the fable (1962)
The Night Before Christmas (1954)
Veronica's Smile (1964)
The Christmas Whale (1945)

Notes

References

External links

 Roger Duvoisin at Consumer Help Web
 Roger Duvoisin 1904–1980, Mother Goose: A Scholarly Exploration, ECLIPSE, School of Communication, Information and Library Studies, Rutgers University (eclipse.rutgers.edu)
 Roger Duvoisin Bibliography at Picture Book Cottage: Collectible Children's Picture Books
 

1900 births
1980 deaths
American children's writers
Caldecott Medal winners
American children's book illustrators
Artists from Geneva
Artists from New York City
Swiss emigrants to the United States
Place of death missing